Condette is a commune in the Pas-de-Calais department in the Hauts-de-France region of France.

Geography
The river Liane forms the northeast commune border and the A16 autoroute passes through the commune.

Population

Places of interest
 The church of St.Martin, dating from the fifteenth century.
 The neo-Gothic Château d’Hardelot, dating from the middle of the nineteenth century.
 The manorhouse of the Grand Moulin.

See also
Communes of the Pas-de-Calais department

References

External links

 Official town website 
 Official website: Tourism in Boulogne and the Boulonnais region

Gallery

Communes of Pas-de-Calais